The Gilmore City–Bradgate Community School District is a public school district headquartered in Gilmore City, Iowa.

The district is located in sections of Humboldt, Pocahontas, and Webster counties. It serves Gilmore City, Bradgate, and Pioneer.

History
The district previously had a grade-sharing agreement with the Twin Rivers Community School District.

The district initially began a grade-sharing agreement with the West Bend–Mallard Community School District in which GC-B sent its high school students to WB-M. By 2012 the two districts were in talks to also have GC-B sent middle school grades 7–8 to WB-M, as GC-B only had 11 students in those grades.

Schools
The Gilmore City–Bradgate School District has a daycare and an elementary school. 7–12 students attend West Bend–Mallard under a whole-grade sharing agreement.

Elementary school
Gilmore City Elementary School

References

External links
Gilmore City–Bradgate School District

School districts in Iowa
Education in Humboldt County, Iowa
Education in Pocahontas County, Iowa
Education in Webster County, Iowa